The magistrate of Nantou is the chief executive of the government of Nantou County. This list includes directly elected magistrates of the county. The incumbent Magistrate is Hsu Shu-hua of Kuomintang since 25 December 2022.

Directly elected County Magistrates

Timeline

References

External links 

 Magistrates - Nantou County Government 
 

Nantou